The Southeastern Public Service Authority (SPSA) is the solid waste management agency for the one-million-population region south of Hampton Roads Harbor and the lower James River in Virginia. Based in Chesapeake, Virginia, it services the independent cities of Chesapeake, Franklin, Norfolk, Portsmouth, Suffolk, and Virginia Beach and the counties of Isle of Wight and Southampton.

SPSA was created by an act of the Virginia General Assembly in 1976. Before, each community in South Hampton Roads fully managed its own solid waste. As federal environmental regulations became stricter in the 1970s, it became apparent that the region needed a regional system to manage the area’s garbage. SPSA converts trash to steam and electricity, which it sells to the U.S. Navy’s Norfolk Naval Shipyard and Dominion Virginia Power.

SPSA facilities are located throughout its  service area. These facilities include the regional landfill, the waste-to-energy system, nine transfer stations, nine household hazardous waste collection stations, and a yard-waste facility that produces mulch and compost, which are sold under the brand name Nature’s Blend. 

Residents in the SPSA region each throw away about six pounds of trash per day, resulting in about 2,200 pounds of trash a year per person, i.e. over a million tons of waste each year. Nearly half of this volume of garbage is converted into steam and electrical energy at the waste-to-energy system, about 40 percent is taken to the landfill and 10 percent is recycled. 

SPSA is ISO 14001 certified.

SPSA has approximately 150 employees.

External links
 http://www.spsa.com/

Waste collection